Leucophlebia xanthopis is a moth of the family Sphingidae. It is known from the Democratic Republic of the Congo and Tanzania.

It is similar to, but differs from Leucophlebia afra in having all the pink areas of the wings and body above much brighter and darker, providing little contrast between the palpi and frons and the rest of the head and thorax. In the more extreme form xanthopis the lower margin of the creamy forewing band is indented between the veins in form rosulenta it is entire.

References

Leucophlebia
Moths described in 1910